Thammudu or Tammudu (Telugu: తమ్ముడు) is a Telugu word meaning younger brother, and may refer to:

 Bhale Thammudu (1969 film), a 1969 Telugu film
 Chitti Tammudu, a 1962 Telugu film by K. B. Tilak
 Naa Thammudu, a 1971 Telugu film
 Thammudu (film), a 1999 Telugu film